Justice, My Foot!  is a 1992 Hong Kong comedy film directed by Johnnie To, starring Stephen Chow, Anita Mui and Ng Man Tat.

Synopsis
Sung is by far the best lawyer in Guangdong and the outlying areas of Southeast China. His skills have earned his family an excellent living, albeit his habit of winning all his cases by whatever means necessary. Because of his shyster ways, none of his sons survived beyond a year old, causing grief for his wife Madam Sung. Upon the death of his 13th son, Sung decides to retire from law and switch to business, opening an inn in the middle of town and a tea stand on the outskirts of the city.

Sung finds it difficult to truly give up his former career, and in his boredom reenacts his final case constantly. A chance encounter between Madam Sung and a woman whose husband was suspiciously murdered revives his hopes of returning to court. However, the case is compounded by corrupt magistrates, who make it their goal to bury the truth. Sung needs all his wits to beat a system that he has embraced for a long time, as well as redeem himself so he can finally start a family.

Cast
 Stephen Chow - Sung Sai Kit
 Anita Mui - Madam Sung
 Ng Man-tat
 Carrie Ng
 Wong Yat Fei - Fu / Ah Fuk
 Bryan Leung
 Eddy Ko
 Paul Chun
 Kingdom Yuen
 Mimi Chu

Awards and nominations

See also
 List of Hong Kong films

References

External links
 
 Justice, My Foot! (1992) at Hong Kong Cinemagic
 

Hong Kong comedy films
1990s Cantonese-language films
1992 comedy films
1992 films
Films directed by Johnnie To
1990s Hong Kong films